The Jensen Interceptor is a grand touring car which was hand-built at the Kelvin Way Factory in West Bromwich, near Birmingham in England, by Jensen Motors between 1966 and 1976. The Interceptor name had been used previously by Jensen for the Jensen Interceptor made between 1950 and 1957 at the Carters Green factory. Jensen had extensively used glass-reinforced plastic for the fabrication of body panels in the preceding two decades, but the new Interceptor saw a return to a steel body-shell. The body was designed by an outside firm, Carrozzeria Touring of Italy, rather than the in-house staff. The early bodies were built in Italy by Vignale, before Jensen took production in house, making some subtle body modifications.

Model history and specifications
Jensen Motors used Chrysler V8 engines for the Interceptor, starting with the 6276 cc (383 c.i.) with optional manual (Mark I, only 22 built) or TorqueFlite automatic transmissions driving the rear wheels through a limited slip differential in a conventional Salisbury rear axle. In 1970, the 383 c.i. produced 335 hp SAE gross, or 270 hp SAE net. Since this engine was detuned by Chrysler for use with regular gasoline and only produced 250 hp SAE net in 1971, Jensen chose to use the  Chrysler engine for 1971.

For 1971, two 440 c.i. engines were offered. One had a 4-barrel carburetor and produced 305 hp SAE net. The other, which had three 2-barrel carburetors and produced 330 hp SAE net, was only available in 1971. Only 232 cars were built with the 440 "Six Pack", and it had the distinction of being the most powerful car ever to have been made by Jensen.

For 1972, the 440 c.i. engine with three 2-barrel carburetors was no longer produced by Chrysler. The 440 c.i. engine that remained was detuned to 280 hp SAE net. Chrysler continued to offer a high performance 440 c.i. engine through to 1976 when it only produced 255 hp SAE net.

The Interceptor may have taken some styling cues from the Brasinca Uirapuru, with a distinctive large, curving wrap-around rear window that doubled as a tailgate. The original specification included electric windows, reclining front seats, a wood rimmed steering wheel, radio with twin speakers, reversing lights and an electric clock. Power steering was included as standard from September 1968.

The Mark II was announced in October 1969, with slightly revised styling around the headlamps, front grille and bumper and revised rear lights. The interior was substantially revised in order to meet US regulations, and air conditioning was an option.

The Mark III, introduced in 1971, revised the front grille, headlamp finishers and bumper treatment again. It had GKN alloy wheels and air conditioning as standard, and revised seats. It was divided into G-, H-, and J-series depending on the production year. The 6.3-litre 383ci engine was superseded by the 7.2-litre 440ci in 1971.

Jensen had fallen on hard times by 1975, owing to the then world-wide recession, and to problems with its Jensen-Healey sports car. The company was placed into receivership, and the receivers allowed production to continue until the available cache of parts was exhausted. Production of the Interceptor ended in 1976.

Later, a group of investors trading under the new Jensen Cars Limited brandname stepped in and relaunched production of the 1970s Interceptor, which was briefly re-introduced in the late 1980s as the Series 4 (S4) which was an updated version of the original Interceptor V8 series giving a new lifespan for the Jensen brand and its car production was resumed. The car came back as a low-volume hand-built and bespoke affair, marketed in a similar way to Bristol, with a price of £70,000. Though the body remained essentially the same as the last of the main production run of Series 3, the engine was a much smaller Chrysler-supplied 360 cubic inch (5.9-litre) which used more modern controls to reduce emissions comparatively and still producing about 250 bhp. In addition, the interior was slightly re-designed with the addition of modern "sports" front seats as opposed to the armchair style of the earlier models, as well as a revised dashboard and electronics.

The then owner sold up in 1990 to an engineering company believed to be in a stronger position to manufacture the car; this lasted until 1993 with approximately 36 cars built, and while work commenced on development of a new Interceptor Series 5 (S5) for the 1990s however the receivers were called in for a second time and the company was liquidated.

Performance against competitors (1972)
Performance was competitive with contemporary premium personal luxury cars, the North American market classification in which European grand tourers were sold.

Variants

Jensen FF Four Wheel Drive

Jensen were one of the first manufacturers to equip a production car with four-wheel drive, in the 1967 Jensen FF (Ferguson Formula). At the time it was hailed as a remarkable development, coming also with Dunlop Maxaret mechanical anti-lock brakes and traction control. The car is five inches (127 mm) longer than the Interceptor. Although looking virtually the same, the extra length can be seen from additional side vent ahead of the doors on the front flanks, and an additional swage line in the leading edge of the front wing. Press articles from the time quote "drag-strip" performance when describing the car. In total 320 FFs were produced; 195 Mark I, 110 Mark II and 15 Mark III.

Convertible
A convertible with powered soft top was introduced in 1974, mainly intended for the American market but also sold in Europe. 267 convertibles were made.

Coupé
Rarer still is the Coupé version introduced in 1975; just 60 were made in the one year before the company's demise. The Coupé was derived from the convertible and therefore lacked the distinctive rear window of the regular car.

The Jensen Interceptor R
A Jensen specialist JIA based in Banbury Oxfordshire, England rebuilds original Interceptors using modern components, with a General Motors supplied LS 6.2-litre naturally aspirated or Supercharged engine and 6 speed automatic or manual transmission.

In May 2010, Jensen International Automotive was set up, with the financial backing of Carphone Warehouse founder and chairman Charles Dunstone who joined its board of directors. A small number of Jensen Interceptor Ss, which had started production under a previous company, were completed by Jensen International Automotive (JIA), in parallel with JIA's own production of the new Jensen Interceptor R; deliveries of the latter started at the beginning of 2011.

References

 
 
 John Tipler (2004). Jensen Interceptor: The Complete Story. The Crowood Press. .

External links 
 

1970s cars
Cars introduced in 1966
Convertibles
Grand tourers
Interceptor
Rear-wheel-drive vehicles